In mathematics, a finite von Neumann algebra is a von Neumann algebra in which every isometry is a unitary. In other words, for an operator V in a finite von Neumann algebra if , then . In terms of the comparison theory of projections, the identity operator is not (Murray-von Neumann) equivalent to any proper subprojection in the von Neumann algebra.

Properties
Let  denote a finite von Neumann algebra with center . One of the fundamental characterizing properties of finite von Neumann algebras is the existence of a center-valued trace. This is a normal positive bounded map  with the properties:
 ,
 if  and  then ,

Examples

Finite-dimensional von Neumann algebras
The finite-dimensional von Neumann algebras can be characterized using Wedderburn's theory of semisimple algebras.
Let Cn × n be the n × n matrices with complex entries. A von Neumann algebra M is a self adjoint subalgebra in Cn × n such that M contains the identity operator I in Cn × n.

Every such M as defined above is a semisimple algebra, i.e. it contains no nilpotent ideals. Suppose M ≠ 0 lies in a nilpotent ideal of M. Since M* ∈ M by assumption, we have M*M, a positive semidefinite matrix, lies in that nilpotent ideal. This implies (M*M)k =  0 for some k. So M*M = 0, i.e. M = 0.

The center of a von Neumann algebra M will be denoted by Z(M). Since M is self-adjoint, Z(M) is itself a (commutative) von Neumann algebra. A von Neumann algebra N is called a factor if Z(N) is one-dimensional, that is, Z(N) consists of multiples of the identity I.

Theorem Every finite-dimensional von Neumann algebra M is a direct sum of m factors, where m is the dimension of Z(M). 

Proof: By Wedderburn's theory of semisimple algebras, Z(M) contains a finite orthogonal set of idempotents (projections) {Pi} such that PiPj = 0 for i ≠ j, Σ Pi = I, and

where each Z(M)Pi is a commutative simple algebra. Every complex simple algebras is isomorphic to  
the full matrix algebra Ck × k for some k. But Z(M)Pi is commutative, therefore one-dimensional.

The projections Pi "diagonalizes" M in a natural way. For M ∈ M, M can be uniquely decomposed into M = Σ MPi. Therefore,

One can see that Z(MPi) = Z(M)Pi. So Z(MPi) is one-dimensional and each MPi is a factor. This proves the claim.

For general von Neumann algebras, the direct sum is replaced by the direct integral. The above is a special case of the central decomposition of von Neumann algebras.

Abelian von Neumann algebras

Type  factors

References

Linear algebra